Edrotini is a tribe of darkling beetles in the subfamily Pimeliinae of the family Tenebrionidae. There are more than 50 genera in Edrotini, found primarily in North America and the Neotropics.

Genera
These genera belong to the tribe Edrotini

 Armalia Casey, 1907  (North America and the Neotropics)
 Arthroconus Solier, 1851  (the Neotropics)
 Ascelosodis Redtenbacher, 1868  (the Palearctic and Indomalaya)
 Auchmobius Leconte, 1851  (North America)
 Chilometopon Horn, 1874  (North America)
 Cryptadius Leconte, 1851  (North America)
 Ditaphronotus Casey, 1907  (the Neotropics)
 Edrotes Leconte, 1851  (North America)
 Emmenastrichus Horn, 1894  (North America)
 Emmenides Casey, 1907  (North America)
 Eremocantor Smith & Wirth, 2016  (North America)
 Eschatomoxys Blaisdell, 1935  (North America)
 Eurymetopon Eschscholtz, 1831  (North America)
 Falsoarthroconus Kaszab, 1978  (the Neotropics)
 Garridoa Marcuzzi, 1985  (the Neotropics)
 Hylithus Guérin-Méneville, 1834  (the Neotropics)
 Hylocrinus Casey, 1907  (North America and the Neotropics)
 Kocakia Kaszab, 1985  (the Neotropics)
 Koneus Giraldo-Mendoza & Flores, 2019  (the Neotropics)
 Melanastus Casey, 1907  (North America)
 Mencheres Champion, 1884  (the Neotropics)
 Mesabates Champion, 1884  (North America)
 Mesabatodes Casey, 1907  (North America)
 Metoponium Casey, 1907  (North America)
 Micrarmalia Casey, 1907  (the Neotropics)
 Micromes Casey, 1907  (North America)
 Orthostibia Blaisdell, 1923  (North America)
 Oxygonodera Casey, 1907  (North America)
 Pachacamacius Flores & Giraldo-Mendoza, 2019  (the Neotropics)
 Paraguania Marcuzzi, 1953  (the Neotropics)
 Pescennius Champion, 1884  (North America)
 Pimeliopsis Champion, 1892  (North America)
 Posides Champion, 1884  (North America)
 Prohylithus Kaszab, 1964  (the Neotropics)
 Sechuranus Flores & Giraldo-Mendoza, 2019  (the Neotropics)
 Soemias Champion, 1884  (North America)
 Steriphanides Casey, 1907  (North America)
 Steriphanus Casey, 1907  (North America)
 Stibia Horn, 1870  (North America)
 Stictodera Casey, 1907  (North America)
 Stomion G.R. Waterhouse, 1845  (the Neotropics)
 Telabis Casey, 1890  (North America)
 Telaponium Blaisdell, 1923  (North America)
 Texaponium Thomas, 1984  (North America)
 Tlascalinus Casey, 1907  (North America)
 Trichiotes Casey, 1907  (North America)
 Trientoma Solier, 1835  (the Neotropics)
 Trimytantron Ardoin, 1977  (the Neotropics)
 Trimytis Leconte, 1851  (North America)
 Triorophus Leconte, 1851  (North America)
 Triphalopsis Blaisdell, 1923  (North America)
 Triphalopsoides Doyen, 1990  (the Neotropics)
 Triphalus LeConte, 1866  (North America)
 Troglogeneion Aalbu, 1985  (North America)
 Vizcainyx Aalbu & Smith, 2020  (North America)

References

Further reading

 
 

Tenebrionoidea